Taherabad (also Romanized as Ţāherābād) is a village in Dinavar Rural District, Dinavar District, Sahneh County, Kermanshah Province, Iran. At the 2006 census, its population was 575, in 121 families.

References 

Populated places in Sahneh County